Choi Jun-hong (Hangul: 최준홍; born October 15, 1996), better known by his stage name Zelo, is a South Korean rapper, singer,  beatboxer and dancer best known as the former member of the South Korean boy group B.A.P. He made his recording debut with the single "Never Give Up" under B.A.P's sub-unit Bang&Zelo in November 2011. He departed TS Entertainment in December 2018.

Early life
Zelo was born on October 15, 1996, in Mokpo, South Korea. He has one older brother. He aspired to be a soccer player when he was young, but then changed his dreams to becoming a singer as he chanced upon music and grew interested in it. He started practising beatboxing and dancing at home. In 5th grade, Zelo was introduced by an acquaintance who recognized his talent to Joy Dance - Plug In Music Academy located in Gwangju, which is a well-known music academy. He auditioned for several recording companies but did not succeed generally because he was too young. He was finally accepted as a trainee at TS Entertainment. He graduated from School of Performing Arts Seoul in 2015.

Career

Career beginnings and B.A.P
Zelo first collaborated with Bang Yong-guk in the sub-unit Bang&Zelo. The pair released "Never Give Up" on December 2, 2011. Zelo was revealed as a member of idol sextet B.A.P on January 17, 2012, where he served as the rapper. The group debuted nine days later with its single album Warrior. In November 2014, the group filed a lawsuit against its agency. The members sought to nullify its contract with the company citing "unfair conditions and profit distribution". In August of the following year, the two parties ultimately settled and B.A.P resumed its activities under TS Entertainment. Following the expiration of his contract with TS Entertainment on December 2, 2018, Zelo decided not to renew with the company. He officially departed from the group on December 24, after finishing the European leg of B.A.P's 2018 tour. The remaining four members left the agency in February 2019, leading the dissolution of B.A.P.

Soloist career
Zelo signed an exclusive contract with A Entertainment on January 11, 2019. He held a fan meeting in Japan two months later and began working on a solo record under the company. He released his debut mini-album Distance and its lead single "Questions" on June 21. On August 21, Zelo sent A Entertainment a contract termination letter citing unpaid wages, but the agency did not agree to the termination. In a lawsuit, the Seoul Central District Court ruled in favor of the plaintiff and certified the contract annulment one year later.

Zelo released the collaborative single "Shower" with rappers Lil Oppa and Jvde on January 5, 2020. He released his second mini-album Day2Day and its lead single "She and Malibu" on April 18.

In August 2022, Zelo signed with Uzurocks.

Artistry and influences
Zelo was the second rapper of the group. Zelo cites will.i.am and Kanye West as his role models. He also named 50 Cent and other rappers as his musical influences.

Discography

Extended plays

Singles

As lead artist

As featured artist

Guest appearances

References

1996 births
Living people
TS Entertainment artists
South Korean male idols
South Korean male rappers
K-pop singers
B.A.P (South Korean band) members
School of Performing Arts Seoul alumni
South Korean hip hop dancers
South Korean child singers